Leslie Coleman McCann (born September 23, 1935) is an American jazz pianist and vocalist.

Early life 

Les McCann was born in Lexington, Kentucky. He grew up in a musical family of four, a brother and three sisters with most of McCann's family singing in church choirs. His father was a fan of jazz music and his mother was known to hum opera tunes around the house. As a youth, he played the tuba and drums and performed in his school's marching band. As a pianist McCann was largely self-taught. He explained he only received piano lessons for a few weeks as a six-year-old before his teacher died.

Career 
During his service in the U.S. Navy, McCann won a singing contest which led to an appearance on The Ed Sullivan Show. After leaving the Navy, McCann moved to California and played in his own trio. He declined an offer to work in Cannonball Adderley's band so that he could dedicate himself to his own music. The trio's first job was at the Purple Onion in 1959 accompanying Gene McDaniels.

The main part of McCann's career began in the early 1960s when he recorded as a pianist with his trio for Pacific Jazz. In 1969, Atlantic released Swiss Movement, an album recorded with saxophonist Eddie Harris and trumpeter Benny Bailey earlier at that year's Montreux Jazz Festival. The album contained the song "Compared to What", and both the album and the single reached the Billboard pop charts. "Compared to What" criticized the Vietnam War. The song was written by Eugene McDaniels years earlier and recorded and released as a ballad by McCann in 1966 on his album, Les McCann Plays the Hits. Roberta Flack's version appeared as the opening track on her debut album First Take (1969).

After the success of Swiss Movement, McCann, primarily a piano player emphasized his vocals. He became an innovator in soul jazz merging jazz with funk, soul, and world rhythms. He was among the first jazz musicians to include electric piano, clavinet, and synthesizer in his music.

In 1971, he and Harris were part of a group of soul, R&B, and rock performers–including Wilson Pickett, the Staple Singers, Santana, and Ike & Tina Turner–who flew to Accra, Ghana, to perform a 14-hour concert for over 100,000 Ghanaians. The March 6 concert was recorded for the documentary film Soul to Soul. In 2004, the movie was released on DVD with an accompanying soundtrack album.

McCann had a stroke in the mid-1990s, but he returned to music in 2002 when Pump it Up was released. He has also exhibited his work as a painter and photographer.

Discography

As leader 
 Les McCann Ltd. Plays the Truth (Pacific Jazz, 1960)
 Les McCann Ltd. Plays the Shout (Pacific Jazz, 1960; Sunset, 1970)
 Les McCann Ltd. in San Francisco (Pacific Jazz, 1961)
 Pretty Lady (Pacific Jazz, 1961)
 Les McCann Sings (Pacific Jazz, 1961)
 Somethin' Special  with Richard "Groove Holmes (Pacific Jazz, 1962)
 Les McCann Ltd. in New York (Pacific Jazz, 1962)
 On Time (Pacific Jazz, 1962)
 The Gospel Truth (Pacific Jazz, 1963)
 Les McCann Ltd. Plays the Shampoo (Pacific Jazz, 1963)
 McCanna (Pacific Jazz, 1963)
 Jazz Waltz with the Jazz Crusaders (Pacific Jazz, 1963)
 Spanish Onions (Pacific Jazz, 1964)
 McCann/Wilson with Gerald Wilson (Pacific Jazz, 1964)
 Soul Hits (Pacific Jazz, 1964)
 Beaux J. Pooboo (Limelight, 1965)
 But Not Really (Limelight, 1965)
 Les McCann Plays the Hits (Limelight, 1966)
 A Bag of Gold (Pacific Jazz, 1966)
 Live at Shelly's Manne-Hole (Limelight, 1966)
 Live at Bohemian Caverns - Washington, DC (Limelight, 1967)
 Bucket o' Grease (Limelight, 1967)
 From the Top of the Barrel (Pacific Jazz, 1967)
 More or Les McCann (World Pacific, 1969)
 Much Les (Atlantic, 1969)
 Swiss Movement with Eddie Harris (Atlantic, 1969)
 New from the Big City (World Pacific, 1970)
 Comment (Atlantic, 1970)
 Second Movement with Eddie Harris (Atlantic, 1971)
 Invitation to Openness (Atlantic, 1972)
 Talk to the People (Atlantic, 1972)
 Live at Montreux (Atlantic, 1973)
 Layers (Atlantic, 1973)
 Another Beginning (Atlantic, 1974)
 Doldinger Jubilee '75 (Atlantic, 1975)
 Hustle to Survive (Atlantic, 1975)
 River High, River Low (Atlantic, 1976)
 Music Lets Me Be (ABC/Impulse!, 1977)
 Change, Change, Change  (ABC/Impulse!, 1977)
 The Man (A&M, 1978)
 Tall, Dark & Handsome (A&M, 1979)
 The Longer You Wait (Jam, 1983)
 Music Box (Jam, 1984)
 Road Warriors with Houston Person (Greene Street, 1984)
 Butterfly (Stone, 1988)
 Les Is More (Night, 1990)
 On the Soul Side (MusicMasters, 1994)
 Listen Up! (MusicMasters, 1996)
 Pacifique with Joja Wendt (MusicMasters, 1998)
 How's Your Mother? (32 Jazz, 1998)
 Pump It Up (ESC, 2002)
Vibrations: Funkin' Around Something Old Something New (Jazz Legend Project) (Leafage Jazz/Pony Canyon, 2003)
 The Shout (American Jazz Classics, 2011)
 28 Juillet (Fremeaux, 2018)

As sideman 
 Teddy Edwards, It's About Time (Pacific Jazz, 1960)
 Richard "Groove" Holmes, Groove  (Pacific Jazz, 1961)
 Richard "Groove" Holmes, Tell It Like It Tis (Pacific Jazz, 1961)
 Lou Rawls, Stormy Monday (Capitol, 1962)
 Stanley Turrentine, That's Where It's At (Blue Note, 1962)
 Clifford Scott, Out Front (Pacific Jazz, 1963)
 Stanley Turrentine, Straight Ahead (Blue Note, 1985)
 Cash McCall, Cash Up Front (Stone, 1988)
 Herbie Mann, Deep Pocket (Kokopelli, 1994)
 Bill Evans, Soul Insider (ESC Records, 2000)

References

External links 

 Official website
 Biography
 Discography
Les McCann Interview - NAMM Oral History Library (2015)

1935 births
Living people
African-American jazz musicians
African-American jazz pianists
Hard bop pianists
Jazz-funk pianists
Post-bop pianists
Soul-jazz pianists
Musicians from Lexington, Kentucky
Singers from Kentucky
Atlantic Records artists
20th-century American musicians
Jazz musicians from Kentucky
20th-century American pianists
American male pianists
21st-century American pianists
20th-century American male musicians
21st-century American male musicians
American male jazz musicians
CTI Records artists
20th-century African-American musicians
21st-century African-American musicians